Batishchev or Batischev is a Russian masculine surname, its feminine counterpart is Batishcheva or Batischeva. It may refer to
Oleksandr Batyschev (born 1991), Ukrainian football midfielder 
Stanislav Batishchev (1940–2011), Soviet heavyweight weightlifter

Russian-language surnames